Hong Saeng is a tambon (subdistrict) of Loeng Nok Tha District, Yasothon Province, Isan region (northeastern Thailand). In 2018 it had a total population of 11,485 people.

History
Hong Saeng is a long time and secured home of Phu Thai ethnic group. Their ancestors emigrated from the Xépôn in Laos since 1849–1850, and before that.

Originally, the area was called "Dong Pa Hong Ya Saeng" (ดงป่าฮ่องหญ้าแซง) and was distorted to be "Hong Saeng" in the present day.

Geography
Hong Saeng considered as an area near the border of three provinces, namely Yasothon, Roi Et, and Amnat  Charoen, most of the area consisting of lowlands from central to western parts.

Neighboring tambons are (from the north clockwise): Kut Chiang Mi, Samakkhi, Si Kaeo, and Pha Nam Yoi of Nong Phok District, Roi Et Province.

Economy
Most Hong Saeng residents work in agriculture.

Administration

Central administration
The tambon is subdivided into 19 administrative villages (muban).

Local administration
The whole area of the subdistrict is covered by the subdistrict municipality (Thesaban Tambon) Hong Saeng (เทศบาลตำบลห้องแซง).

Local products
Indigo woven clothing
Kratip (bamboo container for holding cooked glutinous rice)

References

External links
Thaitambon.com on Hong Saeng
Hong Saeng Municipality

Tambon of Yasothon Province